The 59th Pennsylvania House of Representatives District is located in southwest Pennsylvania and has been represented by Leslie Rossi since 2021.

District Profile 
The 59th District is located in Westmoreland County and includes the following areas:

 Bolivar
Cook Township
Derry
Derry Township (part)
District Bradenville 
District Cokeville 
District Cooperstown 
District Kingston 
District Loyalhanna 
District Millwood 
District New Derry 
District Peanut 
District Saxman 
District Scalp Level 
District Torrance
 Donegal
 Donegal Township
 Fairfield Township
Latrobe
 Laurel Mountain
 Ligonier
 Ligonier Township
 Mount Pleasant Township (part)
District Laurel Run 
District Mammoth 
District Pleasant Valley 
District Ridgeview 
District United 
District Westmoreland
New Florence
 Seward
St. Clair Township
 Unity Township
Youngstown

Representatives

Recent election results

References

External links 

 District map from the United States Census Bureau
 Pennsylvania House Legislative District Maps from the Pennsylvania Redistricting Commission.
 Population Data for District 59 from the Pennsylvania Redistricting Commission.

Government of Somerset County, Pennsylvania
Government of Westmoreland County, Pennsylvania
59